Thirupaachi is a 2005 Indian Tamil-language action film written and directed by Perarasu. The film stars Vijay, Trisha and Mallika, with Livingston, Pasupathy, Benjamin, Kota Srinivasa Rao, Vaiyapuri and Manoj K. Jayan in other roles. Chaya Singh made a guest appearance in a song. The film featured score composed by Dhina, and a soundtrack jointly composed by Dhina, Devi Sri Prasad, and Mani Sharma. The story is about the upright lifestyle of Sivagiri and the affectionate bond with his sister.

Thirupaachi was released on 14 January 2005. The film ran for 250 days in theatres and was declared a commercial success. It was remade in 2006 in two languages: in Kannada as Thangigagi and in Telugu as Annavaram.

Plot

Sivagiri is a bladesmith in a remote village near Thirupaachi. He has a lovable sister named Karpagam. He runs into some hilarious incidents while searching locally for a groom for his sister. Sivagiri confides to his friend Kannapan that he wants his sister to be in a good city after her marriage. Sivagiri also nods his acceptance when a city guy proposes to Karpagam. He accompanies the newlyweds to Chennai and finds a girl named Subha welcoming them, and they both fall in love after initial mishaps.

On a trip to Chennai, Sivagiri rescues a court witness from Pattasu Balu, a don dominating central Chennai. He also learns of a local don Pan Parag Ravi, who controls North Chennai and troubles Karpagam's husband's canteen business. In an altercation in a cinema theater, Kannappan gets murdered by a thug Saniyan Sagadai, who dominates South Chennai. Karpagam's husband told Sivagiri to leave Chennai if he wants his sister to be happy. After Kannapan's funeral, he leaves his hometown, stating that he got a job in a cloth manufacturing company. In reality, he comes with a mission in Chennai.

Sivagiri warns Sagadai, stating that the latter will be killed by him. He also calls ACP Raj Guru and warns him that he will kill all the dons of Chennai, as the police department fails in their duty. Later on, Sivagiri's friend Veluchamy who is a police inspector, learns of this. Sivagiri challenges Veluchamy that he will give up his mission if the latter keeps any one thug of Chennai in jail at least for a single day. Veluchamy fails in his mission and loses his son, as he was killed by Balu.

This harsh lesson makes Veluchamy help Sivagiri. Thus, Veluchamy lists Sivagiri the entire mafia network of Chennai by providing the specification of who leads the various areas. Sivagiri writes their names in papers and randomly chooses Balu. He kills Balu, stating that he is not killing instead 'clearing'. One day, Subha meets Sivagiri in a temple and finds that he is not working in any cloth manufacturing company. Sivagiri manages to make Subha believe that he is working in a travels company. Thus, Subha gets a promise from Sivagiri that he should meet her and spend time with her frequently.

Later on, Sivagiri provokes Ravi to kill his own brother by sticking funeral posters of Ravi and making him think that his brother is the person who is killing people all over Chennai. After the death of Ravi's brother, Ravi realizes his brother is not the one who stuck the funeral posters, so he hides himself in a politician's house to be away and safe from the hands of Sivagiri. The politician damages his car and house and makes the policebelieve that someone has attacked his house. The police decides to provide security for the politician. This makes Ravi feel happy, considering that Sivagiri can't come to his place by fooling all these inspectors and kill him. Veluchamy soon found out that Ravi is hiding in the politician's place.

Sivagiri wants Veluchamy to disband the police protection, but Veluchamy refused because that is the police's responsibilities to protect. He can only inform Sivagiri, who has to kill Ravi. Later on, Sivagiri brings a group of people who rally due losing their money to a fraud financier who is hiding in the politician's place. With the rally, Sivagiri enters Ravi's fort and kills him. Raj inquires the people who were involved in the rally regarding identity of Sivagiri. However, nobody wants to tell anything because they think Sivagiri is doing the police's job while the police do nothing and wait for their salary. Raj's daughter is willing to die than reveal Sivagiri's identity because she was rescued by Sivagiri from Balu.

Later on, Sivagiri decides to kill Sagadai, and warns him. This makes Sagadai seek the protection of a mass group of thugs from Chennai. Sivagiri uses this as a chance to destroy the entire mafia gang of Chennai. He ignites a war between the police group and mafia gang in a very diplomatic manner. Sivagiri disguises himself as a police inspector and enters Sagadai's fort. Veluchamy helps Sivagiri in his mission by hurting himself. Raj orders his squad to hit the thugs.

Sivagiri enters the house in a police uniform, confronts a thug, and forces him to wear a police uniform. After that, Sivagiri shoots and kills the thug and throws him out of the window. Thinking that one of his fellow officers is dead, Raj orders for open fire. All the thugs were killed, but when they checked the dead 'police officer', they realize Sivagiri's trick and run upstairs to find him. However, Sivagiri already stabbed Sagadai (taking revenge for his friend Kannapan's death) and threw him to the ground right before the birth of a new year. Subha welcomes Sivagiri, Karpagam, and her husband once again after returning home. Sivagiri gives Subha the necklace that he is wearing, and they unite at the end.

Cast

Production

Development 
Thirupaachi was announced in 2004 and marked the directorial debut of Perarasu who earlier assisted Rama Narayanan and N. Maharajan. Thirupaachi was Vijay's 40th film and fifth collaboration with Supergood Films. The film was initially titled Girivalam.

Casting 
Jyothika was considered for lead role before finalising Trisha, who earlier paired with Vijay in Ghilli. She along with actress Mallika in supporting role was selected for the film. Actor Vikram's father Vinodraj was selected to play Vijay's father. Chaya Singh was roped in for special appearance.

Filming 
Despite planning to shoot in Thirupachi, a village near Madurai - Ramanathapuram border, Perarasu opted against to shoot there as it may create traffic problems instead the village portions were shot in Karaikudi.

A set resembling Ayyanar temple with a 90-foot statue, surrounded by 200 mud horse costing about 3 million was designed by M. Prabhakar in a village near Karaikudi, a song was shot with about 1,500 junior artistes in that set and it took a week to complete the song. The climax for the film was shot in Vasan House, Chennai where a huge crowd of junior artistes taking part each day of the two weeks it took to complete the scene. Other filming locations were Visakhapatnam, Arakkuveli, with a song shot in South Africa.

Music

The soundtrack has seven songs, five songs were composed by Dhina, while Devi Sri Prasad (Kattu Kattu) and Mani Sharma (Kannum Kannumthan) had composed one song respectively. For the song "Kattu Kattu", Devi Sri Prasad reused music from the song "Pattu Pattu", which he produced from the movie Shankar Dada M.B.B.S.

For the song, "Kannum Kannumthan", the latter had reused music from the song "Chitti Nadumune", which he himself produced for the Telugu film Gudumba Shankar. 

The lyrics for all the songs were penned by Perarasu.

Release
Thirupaachi was released on 14 January 2005 on the eve of Pongal with other releases like Ayya, Iyer IPS, Aayudham and Devathaiyai Kanden. Tirupaachi released with 207 prints.

After the success of Thirupaachi, A. M. Rathnam called Perarasu to make Sivakasi with Vijay re-uniting with him for second time.

Reception

Critical response
Behindwoods wrote: "Another tailor-made role for Vijay, Tiruppachi scores with its impressive screenplay. Although the story is the perennial tear-jerker of a brother's affection for his sister, the packaging will attract the audience". Indiaglitz wrote: "It is a film for Vijay's fans who love their star to dance with energy, fight with enthusiasm and love with mischief. He does all this in his usual style. Punchline dialogues, songs glorifying hero find their place in all throughout the movie". Malini Mannath wrote for Chennai Online: "It's a debutant's work, but director Perarasu reveals an appreciable grasp of the medium. Rehashing the by-now-familiar story line of a rural youth's trip to the big bad city of Chennai, his taking on the anti-social elements single-handedly, Perarasu tries to make slight variations within the parameters of this scenario, weaving in the right dose of humour, action and sentiment and succeeds in presenting a film that is fast-paced and engaging from the opening to the final scene. Except when the dances intrude". Sify wrote: "Vijay has stuck to his regular formula - five songs, flying fights, crass comedy, punch line dialogues, dream songs in foreign locales and corny sentiments. So if you have seen earlier films of the superstar you may strive hard to find anything new in Tirupachi, which is old wine served in a new bottle, with a different label. Ananda Vikatan rated the film 40 out of 100. Visual Dasan of Kalki called Thirupaachi "Not only the angry brother but also the masala king".

Box office
The film released on the Pongal festival in Tamil Nadu alongside Ayya and with Dhanush starrer Devathayai Kanden. The film opened up to full houses with 80 percent occupancy from Chennai and other districts of the state. After taking a fantastic opening for the first week, the film took a slight fall in crowd for the second week. The film completed a 100-day theatrical run in 112 Screens and 200-day run  at Tamilnadu.

Controversy 
After Thirupaachi's release, Super Good Films was sued by Godrej Sara Lee Ltd. for what they considered "defamatory, prejudicial, offensive and slanderous" use of the mosquito spray HIT, of which they are the trademark owners. Godrej eventually won the case, obtaining "an order of permanent injunction and damages" worth 500,000 from Super Good Films.

See also 
Ghilli

References

External links 
 

2000s masala films
2000s Tamil-language films
2005 action films
2005 directorial debut films
2005 films
Films directed by Perarasu
Films scored by Devi Sri Prasad
Films scored by Mani Sharma
Films set in Tamil Nadu
Films shot in South Africa
Films shot in Tamil Nadu
Films shot in Visakhapatnam
Indian action films
Indian films about revenge
Tamil films remade in other languages